The West Amwell Township School District was a community public school district that served students in pre-Kindergarten through sixth grade from West Amwell Township, in Hunterdon County, New Jersey, United States. The district's school is now part of the South Hunterdon Regional School District, which also includes Lambertville and Stockton.

In a special election held in September 2013, voters from Lambertville, Stockton and West Amwell Township passed referendums to dissolve the South Hunterdon Regional High School District and to combine the three existing K-6 school districts from each municipality (Lambertville City School District, Stockton Borough School District and West Amwell Township School District), with majorities in each community passing both ballot items. A single combined regional district would be created, serving students in pre-Kindergarten through twelfth grade, in which property taxes would be levied under a formula in which 57% is based on property values and 43% on the number of students. The executive county superintendent will appoint an interim board of education for the new regional district, which will be responsible for implementing the merger.

As of the 2011-12 school year, the district's one school had an enrollment of 244 students and 23.6 classroom teachers (on an FTE basis), for a student–teacher ratio of 10.34:1.

The district was classified by the New Jersey Department of Education as being in District Factor Group "FG", the fourth-highest of eight groupings. District Factor Groups organize districts statewide to allow comparison by common socioeconomic characteristics of the local districts. From lowest socioeconomic status to highest, the categories are A, B, CD, DE, FG, GH, I and J.

Public school students in seventh through twelfth grades attended the South Hunterdon Regional High School in Lambertville, part of the South Hunterdon Regional High School District, which serves students from Lambertville, Stockton and West Amwell Township.

School
The West Amwell Township Elementary School had an enrollment of 244 students as of the 2011-12 school year.
Scott Uribe, Principal

Administration
Core members of the district's administration were:
Dr. Michael G. Kozak, Superintendent
Sue Simonye, Business Administrator / Board Secretary

References

External links
West Amwell Township School

School Data for the West Amwell Township School, National Center for Education Statistics
South Hunterdon Regional High School

West Amwell Township, New Jersey
2014 disestablishments in New Jersey
School districts disestablished in 2014
New Jersey District Factor Group FG
School districts in Hunterdon County, New Jersey